Franziska Preuß (also spelled Preuss, born 11 March 1994) is a German biathlete. Preuß started in her first world cup races in the 2013/14-season after winning two medals at the last European Championships, three medals at the Junior World Championships and 3 gold medals (4 in total) at the 2012 Winter Youth Olympics. In 2014, she participated in the Winter Olympics in Sochi. She was officially nominated by the DOSB on 23 January 2014.

Biathlon results
All results are sourced from the International Biathlon Union.

Olympic Games
1 medal (1 bronze)

*The mixed relay was added as an event in 2014.

World Championships
7 medals (1 gold, 5 silver, 1 bronze)

*During Olympic seasons competitions are only held for those events not included in the Olympic program.
**The single mixed relay was added as an event in 2019.

Winter Youth Olympics

World Cup

Shooting statistics

Key:Hits / shots, percentage. Results in all IBU World Cup races including relay events.

Individual victories

Relay victories

World Cup Highlights

*Results are from  IBU races which include the Biathlon World Cup, Biathlon World Championships and the Winter Olympic Games.

References

External links
 
 
 
 

1994 births
Living people
Biathletes at the 2014 Winter Olympics
Biathletes at the 2018 Winter Olympics
Biathletes at the 2022 Winter Olympics
Medalists at the 2022 Winter Olympics
Olympic bronze medalists for Germany
Olympic medalists in biathlon
Olympic biathletes of Germany
German female biathletes
People from Wasserburg am Inn
Sportspeople from Upper Bavaria
Biathlon World Championships medalists
Biathletes at the 2012 Winter Youth Olympics
Youth Olympic gold medalists for Germany
21st-century German women